Rotaria or Rotăria may refer to:

 Rotăria, a village in Motoșeni Commune, Bacău County, Romania
 Rotăria, a village in Ciortești Commune, Iași County, Romania
 Rotaria (diocese), ancient bishopric in Numidia, North Africa